Curtis Fuller and Hampton Hawes with French Horns is an album by trombonist Curtis Fuller with pianist Hampton Hawes recorded in 1957 and originally released as one-half of a 16rpm record Baritones and French Horns but later re-released on the Status label, a subsidiary of Prestige Records in 1964.

Reception

Writing for AllMusic, reviewer Scott Yanow stated: "the colorful ensembles and the very adept soloing by the French horns make this a particularly memorable recording. Strange that this album has been obscure for so long. Only the brief playing time keeps this intriguing set from getting a higher rating".

Track listing
 "Ronnie's Tune" (Salvatore Zito) - 7:27   
 "Roc and Troll" (Teddy Charles) - 7:11   
 "A-Drift" (Zito) - 6:13  
 "Lyriste" (Charles) - 6:00  
 "Five Spot" (David Amram) - 3:28    
 "No Crooks" (Charles) - 6:26

Personnel
Curtis Fuller - trombone 
Teddy Charles (track 4), Hampton Hawes (tracks 1-3, 5 & 6) - piano
Sahib Shihab - alto saxophone
David Amram, Julius Watkins - French horn 
Addison Farmer - bass 
Jerry Segal - drums

References 

Prestige Records albums
Curtis Fuller albums
Hampton Hawes albums
1964 albums
Albums recorded at Van Gelder Studio
Albums produced by Bob Weinstock